Ueli Sutter (born 16 March 1947) is a Swiss former cyclist. He competed in the individual road race and team time trial events at the 1972 Summer Olympics.

Major results
1972
 1st Stage 5 Tour de l'Avenir
1974
 3rd Road race, National Road Championships
1975
 3rd Road race, National Road Championships
1976
 2nd Road race, National Road Championships
1977
 4th Overall Tour de Suisse
1978
 2nd Overall Tour de Suisse
 10th Overall Giro d'Italia
1st  Mountains classification
1979
 1st Stages 4 (TTT) & 8 (TTT) Tour de France
 6th Overall Tour de Suisse
1981
 6th Overall Tour de Suisse

References

External links
 

1947 births
Living people
Swiss male cyclists
Olympic cyclists of Switzerland
Cyclists at the 1972 Summer Olympics
Sportspeople from the canton of Solothurn